Ejvind Pedersen (born 22 March 1950) is a Danish former backstroke swimmer. He competed at the 1968 Summer Olympics and the 1972 Summer Olympics.

References

External links
 

1950 births
Living people
Danish male backstroke swimmers
Olympic swimmers of Denmark
Swimmers at the 1968 Summer Olympics
Swimmers at the 1972 Summer Olympics
Swimmers from Copenhagen